Bragg may refer to:

Places
Bragg City, Missouri, United States
Bragg, Texas, a ghost town, United States
Bragg, West Virginia, an unincorporated community, United States
Electoral district of Bragg, a state electoral district in South Australia, Australia
Bragg Islands, Graham Land, Antarctica
Bragg (crater), a crater on the Moon

People
Bragg (surname), people with the surname

Other uses
Bragg Institute, a neutron and X-ray scattering group in Australia
Bragg Box, a type of traveling museum exhibit invented by Laura Bragg
Bragg Communications, a Canadian cable television provider
Bragg Live Food Products, Inc, a health food company started by Paul Bragg
Bragg's Mill, Ashdon, an English windmill
Bragg House (disambiguation), various houses on the National Register of Historic Places
Bragg Memorial Stadium, a football stadium in Tallahassee, Florida

Physics
Bragg's law
Distributed Bragg reflector
Fiber Bragg grating

See also
Brag (disambiguation)
Fort Bragg (North Carolina), a major US Army base
Fort Bragg, California, a city in coastal Mendocino County 
Bragge (surname)  
Braggs (disambiguation)